Ian Cathro (born 11 July 1986) is a Scottish football coach, who is a first team coach at Al-Ittihad. He was previously an assistant coach at Rio Ave, Valencia, Newcastle United and Tottenham Hotspur, and was briefly the head coach at Scottish Premiership club Hearts.

Playing career
Cathro played youth football for Forfar Athletic and Brechin City.

Coaching career

Youth coach
After working as a local youth coach in Dundee, Cathro became the head of Dundee United's youth academy at the age of 22. During his time with Dundee United, he also worked for the Scottish Football Association's local youth programme. Ryan Gauld has cited Cathro as one of the biggest influences on his career.

Assistant manager
In 2012, he became the assistant manager of Portuguese club Rio Ave. In 2014, he followed Nuno, his manager at Rio Ave, to Spanish club Valencia, where he also became assistant manager. The two had first met at an SFA coaching course in Scotland in 2009. He resigned his Valencia post on 11 June 2015.

A fortnight later, he agreed to join Premier League side Newcastle United as assistant to Steve McClaren, the recently appointed manager. When McClaren was sacked by Newcastle United in March 2016 and replaced by Rafa Benítez, Cathro was thought highly enough of to be retained as assistant manager.

Heart of Midlothian
Cathro was appointed head coach of Scottish Premiership club Heart of Midlothian on 5 December 2016. The appointment caused some debate within Scottish football. Kilmarnock player Kris Boyd questioned whether such a young manager, with limited playing experience, could command the respect of the squad. Hearts performed poorly in the second half of the 2016–17 season, winning 5 of 22 league games after Cathro was appointed. They fell to fifth place in the league and were knocked out of the 2016–17 Scottish Cup by their Edinburgh derby rivals Hibernian. After Hearts failed to qualify from the 2017–18 Scottish League Cup group stage, Cathro was sacked. Celtic manager Brendan Rodgers said that there appeared to be a "confused" approach at Hearts, with a mismatch between the style of play Cathro wanted to implement and the type of players signed by the club. After Cathro left, Hearts interim manager Jon Daly and player Cole Stockton claimed that the physical training under Cathro had lacked intensity.

Wolves
After almost a year out of football, Cathro was appointed first-team coach at Wolverhampton Wanderers in June 2018, linking up again with Nuno, who Cathro worked with in Portugal and Spain.

Tottenham Hotspur
On 3 July 2021, Cathro followed former-Wolves manager Nuno to Tottenham Hotspur, after being appointed assistant head coach.

Managerial statistics

References

1986 births
Living people
Footballers from Dundee
Scottish footballers
Forfar Athletic F.C. players
Brechin City F.C. players
Scottish football managers
Heart of Midlothian F.C. managers
Scottish Professional Football League managers
Dundee United F.C. non-playing staff
Newcastle United F.C. non-playing staff
Scottish expatriates in Portugal
Scottish expatriates in Spain
Wolverhampton Wanderers F.C. non-playing staff
Tottenham Hotspur F.C. non-playing staff
Association footballers not categorized by position
Association football coaches